Hamat Air Base is a Lebanese Air Force base in Hamat, Lebanon. It was built in the mid-1970s. The airport was however never used for civilian purposes. Although its heavily damaged runway (numerous holes as result of airstrikes) has been patched, the airfield is currently used only by the Lebanese Air Force with Puma helicopters and Super Tucano light attack aircraft. The airfield is also used by the Special Forces school.

Air base aircraft
The base has the following aircraft:
6 A-29B Super Tucano counter insurgence planes
6 IAR 330 Puma multi-role helicopters
5 MD-530F light attack helicopters (6 delivered:,one crashed on 5 January 2022:)

References

Airports in Lebanon
Lebanese Air Force bases